Saint-Sauveur-Camprieu is a commune in the Gard department in southern France.

Geography

Climate

Saint-Sauveur-Camprieu has a oceanic climate (Köppen climate classification Cfb) closely bordering on a warm-summer Mediterranean climate (Csb).

Population

Sights
 Bramabiau Gorge
 Arboretum de Saint-Sauveur-des-Pourcils

See also
Communes of the Gard department

References

Communes of Gard